Nord-Heggdal is a village in Molde Municipality in Møre og Romsdal county, Norway. The Nord-Heggdal Chapel is located here.

References

Molde
Villages in Møre og Romsdal